Black Oak Mine Unified School District (BOMUSD) is a school district headquartered in Georgetown, unincorporated El Dorado County, California.

The school district was formed from a merger of smaller school districts in 1975.

Schools
All schools are in unincorporated areas.

Secondary schools:
 Zoned: Golden Sierra High School (Garden Valley)
 Alternative: Divide High School (Garden Valley)

Primary schools:
 Georgetown School (Georgetown)
 Northside School (Cool)
American River Charter School K-12(Garden Valley)

Previous schools
Previous schools include:
 Creekside School
 Otter Creek School (Georgetown)

References

External links

 

School districts in El Dorado County, California
School districts established in 1975
1975 establishments in California